Totaladoh is a census town in Nagpur district in the Indian state of Maharashtra.

Demographics
 India census, Totaladoh had a population of 2336. Males constituted 51% of the population and females 49%. Totaladoh had an average literacy rate of 65%, higher than the national average of 59.5%: male literacy was 74%, and female literacy was 56%. In Totaladoh, 12% of the population was under 6 years of age.

References

Cities and towns in Nagpur district